{{Automatic taxobox
|image = Grevillea 1.jpg
|image_caption = Grevillea banksii in flower
|display_parents = 3
|taxon = Grevillea
|authority = R.Br. ex Knight
|subdivision_ranks = Species
|subdivision = See List of Grevillea species
|synonyms_ref = 
|synonyms = {{collapsible list |
 Anadenia R.Br. 
 Conogyne (R.Br.) Spach 
 Cycloptera (R.Br.) Spach 
 Eriostylis (R.Br.) Spach nom. illeg.
 Grevillea [infragen.] Manglesia (Endl.) Asch. & Graebn. 
 Grevillea sect. Conogyne R.Br. 
 Grevillea sect. Cycloptera R.Br. 
 Grevillea sect. Eriostylis R.Br. 
 Grevillea sect. Lissostylis R.Br. 
 Grevillea sect. Lysanthe (Salisb. ex Knight) Kuntze 
 Grevillea sect. Lysianthe Kuntze orth. var.
 Grevillea sect. Manglesia (Endl.) Meisn. 
 Grevillea sect. Plagiopoda R.Br. 
 Grevillea sect. Ptychocarpa R.Br. 
 Grevillea subg. Manglesia (Endl.) Meisn. 
 Grevillia Knight orth. var.
 Lissostylis (R.Br.) Spach nom. illeg., nom. superfl.
 Lysanthe Salisb. ex Knight nom. rej.
 Manglesia Endl. 
 Plagiopoda (R.Br.) Spach 
 Ptychocarpa (R.Br.) Spach 
 Stylurus Salisb. ex Knight
}}
}}Grevillea,  commonly known as spider flowers, is a genus of about 360 species of evergreen flowering plants in the family Proteaceae. Plants in the genus Grevillea are shrubs, rarely trees, with the leaves arranged alternately along the branches, the flowers zygomorphic, arranged in racemes at the ends of branchlets, and the fruit a follicle that splits down one side only, releasing one or two seeds.

Description
Plants in the genus Grevillea are shrubs, rarely small trees with simple or compound leaves arranged alternately along the branchlets. The flowers are zygomorphic and typically arranged in pairs along a sometimes branched raceme at the ends of branchlets. The flowers are bisexual, usually with four tepals in a single whorl. There are four stamens and the gynoecium has a single carpel. The fruit is a thin-walled follicle that splits down only one side, releasing one or two seeds before the next growing season.

Taxonomy
The genus Grevillea was first formally described in 1809 by Joseph Knight from an unpublished manuscript by Robert Brown. Knight gave the spelling Grevillia, corrected by Brown in 1810 to Grevillea in Transactions of the Linnean Society of London. The genus was named in honour of Charles Francis Greville, an 18th-century patron of botany and co-founder of the Royal Horticultural Society.

Species

There are over 350 species which are endemic to Australia. Five other species are endemic to areas outside Australia. Three of these (G. exul, G. gillivrayi, and G. meisneri) are endemic to New Caledonia, while G. elbertii and G. papuana are endemic to Sulawesi and New Guinea respectively. Two other species, G. baileyana and G. glauca, occur in both New Guinea and Queensland.

Distribution and habitat
Grevilleas grow in most habitats, although few grow in alpine areas, in swamps or saline soils. Most species are endemic to Australia but three species grow in New Guinea, (G. papuana is endemic), three are endemic to New Caledonia and one species (G. elbertii) is endemic to Sulawesi in Indonesia.

Ecology
Grevilleas are good bird-attracting plants. Honeyeaters in particular are common visitors. They are also used as food plants by the larvae of some Lepidoptera species, including the dryandra moth and Pieris rapae (small butterfly or cabbage white butterfly).

Uses

Use in horticulture
Many species of grevilleas are popular garden plants, especially in Australia but also in other temperate and subtropical climates. Many grevilleas have a propensity to interbreed freely, and extensive hybridisation and selection of horticulturally desirable attributes has led to the commercial release of many named cultivars. The cultivar 'Canberra Gem' has gained the Royal Horticultural Society's Award of Garden Merit. 

They can be grown from soft tip cuttings from December–March (in the Southern Hemisphere) or fresh seed. Many harder-to-grow species can be grafted onto hardy rootstock such as Grevillea robusta.

There is an active Grevillea Study Group in the Australian Native Plants Society for people interested in grevilleas, both for uses in horticulture and for conservation in the wild.

Traditional Aboriginal use

Grevillea flowers were a traditional favourite among the Aboriginal Peoples for their sweet nectar. This could be shaken onto the hand to enjoy, or into a coolamon with a little water to make a sweet drink. They might be referred to as the original "bush lollies".

Drinking nectar direct from the flower is best avoided as some commonly cultivated grevillea species produce flowers containing toxic cyanide.Everist, S.L., Poisonous Plants of Australia, Angus & Robertson, 1974.

Colonial furniture
A grevillea wood veneer was used on a Pembroke table, a small table with two drawers and folding sides, made in the 1790s for Commissioner of the Royal Navy, Sir Andrew Snape Hamond. The timber from which the veneer was made, referred to as 'beef wood', was sent from Port Jackson by Surgeon-General John White, who arrived in the new penal colony of Australia with the First Fleet. This table is in the collection of the National Museum of Australia in Canberra.

Gallery

References

External links

 ANPSA.org: Grevillea website  — by ASGAP−Australian Native Plants Society''.
  Grevilleapark.org: Illawarra Grevillea Park website
 PlantList search for Grevillea. Retrieved 20190318.

 
Proteaceae genera
Taxa named by Robert Brown (botanist, born 1773)
Proteales of Australia
Australasian realm flora